Stewart Cobblestone Farmhouse is a historic home located at Mendon in Monroe County, New York. It is a vernacular Greek Revival style cobblestone farmhouse built about 1835. It is constructed of medium-sized field cobbles and is one of only 10 surviving cobblestone buildings in Mendon.  The house features a Colonial Revival style portico added in the 20th century.

It was listed on the National Register of Historic Places in 1997.

References

Houses on the National Register of Historic Places in New York (state)
Cobblestone architecture
Greek Revival houses in New York (state)
Houses completed in 1835
Houses in Monroe County, New York
National Register of Historic Places in Monroe County, New York